Mount Ethelred is a mainly ice-covered mountain,  high,  southeast of Mount Ethelwulf and  inland from George VI Sound, in the Douglas Range of Alexander Island, Antarctica. The mountain was probably first observed by Lincoln Ellsworth, who photographed the east side of the Douglas Range from the air on November 23, 1935; its east face was roughly surveyed in 1936 by the British Graham Land Expedition. It was resurveyed in 1948 by the Falkland Islands Dependencies Survey (FIDS) and named for Ethelred I, Saxon King of England, 865–871. The west face of the mountain was mapped from air photos taken by the Ronne Antarctic Research Expedition, 1947–48, by D. Searle of the FIDS in 1960. Mount Ethelred is the seventh highest peak of Alexander Island, proceeded by Mount Calais.

See also
 Mount Edred
 Mount Paris
 Mount Cupola

References 

Mountains of Alexander Island